Cherokee  is a locality situated in the Macedon Ranges Shire, in Victoria, Australia  north of the state capital, Melbourne.

The settlement as it appears today was created by land subdivision around 1880–1881, although the area was occupied by Europeans before this date. Timber mills and a school were operating by 1865, possibly earlier, in response to the demand for timber created by the Victorian gold rush.

Cherokee Post Office opened on 1 July 1927 and closed in 1955.

References

Towns in Victoria (Australia)
Shire of Macedon Ranges